William de Beauchamp (c. 1105–c. 1170) was an Anglo-Norman baron and hereditary sheriff.

He was born in Elmley Castle, Worcestershire, the son of Walter de Beauchamp, who had been made hereditary Sheriff of Worcestershire after the feudal barony of Salwarpe in Worcestershire had been confiscated from his uncle Roger d'Abetot. He served in this capacity from the death of his father in 1130 until his own death around 1170. He also served as sheriff for three other counties, Warwickshire (1157), Gloucestershire (1157–1163) and Herefordshire (1160–1169).

He died in 1170 and was buried in Worcester. He was succeeded by his son William, the eldest of his six children, who inherited the Worcestershire shrievalty in turn.

References

High Sheriffs of Herefordshire
High Sheriffs of Worcestershire
High Sheriffs of Warwickshire
High Sheriffs of Gloucestershire
Sheriffs of Warwickshire
1100s births
1170s deaths
Year of birth uncertain
Year of death uncertain